Kannada films of 1960
Kannada films of 1961
Kannada films of 1962
Kannada films of 1963
Kannada films of 1964
Kannada films of 1965
Kannada films of 1966
Kannada films of 1967
Kannada films of 1968
Kannada films of 1969

See also
 Kannada cinema

References
 Kannada cinema database by University of Pennsylvania

External links
 Kannada Movies of 1960s at the Internet Movie Database

1960s
Kannada-language
Films, Kannada